Edson Pereira de Barros (born 30 September 1971), known as Niquinha, is a Brazilian retired footballer who played as a midfielder.

Club career
Born in Belo Horizonte, Minas Gerais, Niquinha started his professional career in Brazil with Clube Náutico Capibaribe and Manchete Futebol Clube, with a spell in between with Sport Club do Recife in which he collected no Série A appearances. He moved to Portugal in 1997, joining Rio Ave F.C. where he went on to become one of its most influential players, with nearly 400 competitive games for the Vila do Conde club.

After still contributing regularly in the 2008–09 season – 22 matches, 16 starts – as Rio Ave eventually retained their Primeira Liga status, Niquinha returned home aged 38, joining amateurs Associação Atlética Francana.

External links

1971 births
Living people
Footballers from Belo Horizonte
Brazilian footballers
Association football midfielders
Campeonato Brasileiro Série A players
Clube Náutico Capibaribe players
Sport Club do Recife players
Primeira Liga players
Liga Portugal 2 players
Rio Ave F.C. players
Brazilian expatriate footballers
Expatriate footballers in Portugal
Brazilian expatriate sportspeople in Portugal